Wasilewski (femine: Wasilewska) is a Polish surname, it may refer to:
  (born 1949)
 Audrey Wasilewski (born 1967), American actress and voice actress
 Carolyn Wasilewski (1940–1954), victim of an unsolved 1954 murder in Baltimore, Maryland
 Edward Wasilewski (1923–1968), Polish anti-communist fighter
 Erika Lauren Wasilewski, an American radio personality, singer-songwriter, and former reality television personality
 Ewa Wasilewska (born 1967), Polish speed skater
 Henryk Wasilewski (1953–2012), Polish middle distance runner
 Leon Wasilewski (1870–1936), Polish politician
 Małgorzata Wasilewska (born 1960), Polish human rights activist and diplomat
 Marcin Wasilewski (born 1980), Polish footballer
 Mieczysław Wasilewski (born 1942), Polish graphic designer
 Nicholas Wasilewski, video-game developer
 Paul Wasilewski (born 1982), Polish-American actor
 Peter "JR" Wasilewski (born 1976), American saxophonist
 Regina Wasilewska-Kita (born 1951), Polish politician
 Tomasz Wasilewski (born 1980), Polish film director and screenwriter
 Wanda Wasilewska (1905–1964), Polish communist writer
 , Polish politician

See also 
 Mount Wasilewski
 Vasilevsky (disambiguation)

Polish-language surnames